Varieties on Parade is a 1951 American musical film directed by Ron Ormond.

Plot

Cast
Jackie Coogan
Eddie Garr
Tom Neal

External links

Varieties on Parade at TCMDB
Varieties on Parade at BFI

1951 films
American musical films
1951 musical films
Lippert Pictures films
American black-and-white films
1950s English-language films
1950s American films